The 20th edition of the Men's Asian Amateur Boxing Championships were held from October 23 to October 30, 1999, in Tashkent, Uzbekistan.

Medal summary

Medal table

References

amateur-boxing

External links
Asian Boxing Confederation

1999
Asian Boxing
Boxing
20th century in Tashkent
Asian Amateur Boxing Championships
Sport in Tashkent